

Examples
 Calling within Vientiane with landline to number 021-123456 dial: 123456
 Calling to Vientiane to Champasak number 041-123456 dial: 041-123456 (with extra fee for calling to other provinces)
 Calling to Vientiane landline from mobile phone to number 021-123456 dial: 021-123456
 Calling to mobile phones by any types of phone to number 020-12345678 dial: 020-12345678
 Calling from any countries to  number 021-123456 dial: +856-21-123456

Area code

Long-distance
Starting January 1, 2012, fixed lines will be allowed to dial directly to other provinces/countries, but still using open dialing plan. To dial to other province, dial area code+phone number (0xx-xxxxxx), and to dial to other countries, dial 00+country code+phone number.

Before 2012, dialing to other provinces is 101, then wait for operator, the same thing as to other countries, but to other countries is 100. Before 2012, mobile phones are already allowed to dial to other provinces/countries directly.

See also 
 Telecommunications in Laos

References 

Laos
Communications in Laos